Tri-County School District was a school district in Arkansas. It served all or parts of: Baxter, Izard, Searcy, and Stone counties. It included the communities of Big Flat and Fifty Six.

It was formed on July 1, 1985, by the merger of Big Flat School District and the Fifty Six School District. On July 1, 1993, it was disestablished with territory given to the following districts: Calico Rock, Marshall, Mountain View, Norfork, and Stone County.

Further reading
These include maps of predecessor districts:
 (Download)
 (Download)
 (Download)
 (Download)

References

Defunct school districts in Arkansas
Education in Baxter County, Arkansas
Education in Izard County, Arkansas
Education in Searcy County, Arkansas
Education in Stone County, Arkansas
School districts established in 1985
1985 establishments in Arkansas
School districts disestablished in 1993
1993 disestablishments in Arkansas